Magdeburg is the capital city of Saxony-Anhalt, Germany.

Magdeburg may also refer to:

Places:
 Magdeburg Region, a region of Saxony-Anhalt, Germany
 Magdeburg (region), a former region of Saxony-Anhalt
 Roman Catholic Diocese of Magdeburg, a modern Roman Catholic diocese
 Marca Geronis, sometimes called the March of Magdeburg, a very large march (border region) in the tenth century 
 Duchy of Magdeburg, a province of Brandenburg-Prussia (1680–1701) and of the Kingdom of Prussia (1701–1807)
 Province of Magdeburg, a province in Nazi Germany from 1944 to 1945
 Magdeburg (Bezirk), a former district (Bezirk) of East Germany
 55735 Magdeburg, an asteroid

Ships:
 Magdeburg-class cruiser, a class of German Imperial Navy ships
 SMS Magdeburg, a German First World War light cruiser, and the lead ship of the class
 Magdeburg, a Braunschweig-class corvette in the German navy

Other uses:
 1. FC Magdeburg, a German football club
 SC Magdeburg, a German multi-sports club

See also 
 Mechthild of Magdeburg (c. 1207–c. 1282/1294), a medieval mystic
 Adalbert of Magdeburg, a canonised German monk